Kavita Singh is an Indian politician from Janata Dal (United). She contested the 2019 Indian general election from Siwan Lok Sabha seat and won. She has also served as the Member of Legislative Assembly from the Daraunda seat in 2011 bypolls and the 2015 elections, a seat which was earlier won by her mother-in-law Jagmato Devi. She is a postgraduate student of JP University, She filed her nomination right in her her bridal attire after marriage. She became a MLA at the age of 26 years. She is married to gangster turned politician Ajay Kumar Singh.

References

People from Siwan, Bihar
Women members of the Lok Sabha
21st-century Indian women politicians
21st-century Indian politicians
Women members of the Bihar Legislative Assembly
Janata Dal (United) politicians
Lok Sabha members from Bihar
Bihar MLAs 2010–2015
Bihar MLAs 2015–2020
India MPs 2019–present
Living people
1976 births